Dhurala is a 2020 Indian Marathi-language political drama film released in 2020 starring Ankush Chaudhari, Alka Kubal, Sai Tamhankar, Siddhartha Jadhav, Sonalee Kulkarni in lead roles with ensemble cast consisting of Amey Wagh, Umesh Kamat, Prasad Oak and many more. The film is directed by Sameer Vidwans and written by Kshitij Patwardhan and revolves around the story of gram panchayat elections in a small village in Maharashtra.

Plot 
Ambegaon is a small village in Maharashtra and the sarpanch Nivrutti "Anna" Ubhe, of the gram panchayat, dies while the new elections are approaching. His eldest son Navnath "Dada" Ubhe runs their family business and considers himself as heir apparent for the sarpanch position and decides to run in the elections. Opposition leader, Harish Gadhwe, is furious over his last loss; but now thinks he has good chance of winning since Dada is new to politics. But the battle gets a new turn when MLA Prithviraj Shinde convinces Jyoti Tai Ubhe to also run in the elections as women empowerment is necessary at grassroot. Jyoti Tai is step-mother of Dada and their relationship has not been very cordial. Dada also inducts his wife Harshada in his newly formed party to give a female face to his team. Hanumantha, the second son of Anna, has a cement business. But his wife Monica sees the power-play going on in the family and persuades Hanumantha also to fight in the elections. The drama continues as the fight for the position intensifies and also disturbs their familial bond.

cast 
 Ankush Chaudhari as Navnath "Dada" Ubhe, eldest son of Anna Ubhe
 Alka Kubal as Jyoti Tai Ubhe (Akka), second wife of Anna Ubhe
 Siddhartha Jadhav as Hanumantha Ubhe, second son of Anna Ubhe
 Amey Wagh as Nilesh Ubhe, youngest son of Anna Ubhe
 Sai Tamhankar as Harshada Ubhe, wife of Dada
 Sonalee Kulkarni as Monica Ubhe, wife of Hanumantha
 Umesh Kamat as Atul
 Prasad Oak as Harish Gadhwe
 Sunil Tawde as Baharmal Kaka
 Sulekha Talwalkar as Sunaina Babar
 Uday Sabnis as Prithviraj Shinde (Bhaiyyasaheb)
 Dnyanada Ramtirthkar as Divya Babar
 Prajakta Hanamghar as Lata Harish Gadhwe
 Priyadarshan Jadhav as PR person in Gadhwe team

Production 
The film is directed by Sameer Vidwans based on the story written by Kshitij Patwardhan. They both have earlier collaborated for films: Time Please (2013), Double Seat (2015), YZ (2016) and Mala Kahich Problem Nahi (2017). In 2013, the storyline was adapted as a play by Vidwans and Patwardhan and was presented under the title Saglech Ubhe Aahet. However, due to poor script writing and a low response from the audience, the play did not do well. The script was then re-written and presented in the film.

Soundtrack

Reception 
In their review, Maharashtra Times compared the films with older Marathi films based on politics like Sinhasan (1979), Vazir (1994), Sarkarnama (1998), Saubhagyavati Sarpanch (1999) and Sattadhish (2000) and appreciated the modernization of politics shown in the film while still keeping the major core same to the old one. The review by Madhura Nerurkar highlights the notable work done in story writing, dialogues, and Tamhankar's portrayal of her lead role. Lokmat compared the film with its play version released in 2013 and noted the tremendous improvement in storyline and scriptwriting.

At the Filmfare Marathi Awards, 2021, the film won seven awards from 16 nominations. Chaudhari won the award in Best Actor category and Tamhankar won award in Best Actress category. She shared the award with Neha Pendse for the film June. The Best Supporting Actor award was presented to Jadhav and Best Supporting Actress award to Kulkarni. She shared the award with Geetanjali Kulkarni for the film Karkhanisanchi Waari. Adarsh Shinde won the award for Best Playback Singer (Male) and AV Prafullachandra received it for Best Background Score. The award for Best Dialogues was shared by Irawati Karnik for Jhimma and Kshitij Patwardhan for Dhurala. The film also received three awards at Ma Ta Sanman ceremony, organized by Maharashtra Times in March 2022.

References 

2021 films
2020s Marathi-language films
Indian drama films